Janet Pancho Gupta is an artist and photographer. Gupta was born and raised in Philippines and is based in Hong Kong.

Biography 
Gupta was born in Mabinay, Negros Oriental, Philippines. The artist and former domestic helper came to Hong Kong from the Philippines in 2000.

Paintings 
As a painter, Gupta is  known to create bold, detailed watercolor works and intense portraits that draw the viewer to the expressions.

Gupta began to paint nature as it was the aspect that she missed the most from her childhood as she was constantly surrounded by it in her hometown back in the Philippines. Gupta's recent "pixelated" artworks highlight her feelings of being enclosed in the small spaces of Hong Kong.

Photography 
Artist Janet Pancho Gupta mixes colourful, up-close images with stark black and whites of city life in Hong Kong.

Gupta calls her work a transformation and not a transition because both painting and photography become a perfect marriage in her creativity. Gupta's photographs capture the daily life in the city, the busy urban landscape and nature in the New Territories.

Exhibitions 
 2017 Asian Contemporary Art, Singapore
 2016 Symphony Of Life, Solo Exhibition Art Show, Philippine Consulate General, Hong Kong (Watercolor Paintings)
 2016 Finding Face, Solo Exhibition, Culture Club Gallery, Soho Central (Street & Nature Photography)
 2014 Group Exhibition, Prince Marco Polo Hotel, Tsim Tsa Tsui, Hong Kong
 2014 Group Exhibition, Visual Art Centre, Hong Kong
 2013  Charity Auction, Helena May, Central
 2012  Hong Kong Contemporary, Presented by Moon Gallery, The Excelsior Hotel, Hong Kong
 2012  Hong Kong Gardening Society, YMCA, T.S.T. Hong Kong
 2008  Colours And Faces Of Life, Solo Exhibition, Culture Club Gallery, Soho, Hong Kong.

References 

Filipino women artists
Filipino women photographers
Filipino photographers
Hong Kong photographers
Hong Kong women photographers
1976 births
Living people